Kingsclere and Whitchurch Rural District is a 1932-established council district that comprised the well-developed rural villages of Kingsclere, Whitchurch and the parishes surrounding them. It was formed in 1932 from two 1894-incorporated rural districts of its two named chief component parts. Its area has become since 1974 wholly part of Basingstoke and Deane district with borough status in the north of Hampshire, England. Basingstoke and Deane Council assumed responsibilities and took over its tax collection functions on 1 April 1974 as well as those of Basingstoke Rural District to its east.

Contents
The civil parishes (and main villages of except where stated):
ASHMANSWORTH
BAUGHURST
BURGHCLERE
EAST WOODHAY
ECCHINSWELL AND SYDMONTON 
HIGHCLERE
HURSTBOURNE PRIORS
KINGSCLERE
LAVERSTOKE
LITCHFIELD AND WOODCOTT 
NEWTOWN 
OVERTON
ST MARY BOURNE
TADLEY 
WHITCHURCH

Character
The area had the North Wessex Downs Area of Outstanding Natural Beauty as to its northern half and its widespread chalklands present good-grade arable farmland for staple crops of wheat, barley, oats and maize.  It sits at the head of the Test valley, a chalk-fed, high-quality watercourse and the area has a number of bottled water suppliers including of the naturally sparkling variety in its area and small-scale vineyards in the English wine industry.  Within the area is Highclere Castle and major villagesbuffered by the rest of their predominantly rural parish land, most populous examples being Tadley, Overton and between 1951-1961 the much-expanded Baughurst.

References

Former non-metropolitan districts of Hampshire
Rural districts of England